Sara Olsson (born 6 March 1990) is a Swedish racing cyclist. She rode at the 2014 UCI Road World Championships.

References

External links

1990 births
Living people
Swedish female cyclists
Place of birth missing (living people)